The 8th Pan Arab Games were held in Beirut, Lebanon between July 12 and July 27, 1997. 3253 athletes from 18 countries participated in events in 22 sports.

Over 50,000 people gathered in the Sports City in Beirut for the opening ceremony of the eighth Pan-Arab games, the first such event to be hosted by Lebanon since forty years.

Individual sports

Equestrian
Ramzy Al Duhami won the gold medal in the individual event.

Football

The football tournament was won by Jordan, defeating Syria 1–0 in the final.

Volleyball

Sports

Medal table

References

 
Pan Arab Games
Pan Arab Games
Pan Arab Games
Pan Arab Games
Pan Arab Games
Multi-sport events in Lebanon
1990s in Beirut